The 18th World Cup season began in December 1983 in Kranjska Gora, Yugoslavia (now Slovenia), and concluded in March 1984 in Oslo, Norway. The overall champions were Pirmin Zurbriggen (his first) and Erika Hess (her second), both of Switzerland.

A break in the schedule in February was for the 1984 Winter Olympics in Sarajevo, Yugoslavia (now Bosnia). The debate over amateur and professional status of world-class skiers came to a head this year over the issue of the Olympic eligibility of the holders of FIS Class B licenses, which were approved in 1981 to permit skiers to accept sponsorship money directly instead of through their national ski federations or Olympic committees. After protests by some of the other top skiers (including twin brothers Phil and Steve Mahre), the International Ski Federation (FIS) ruled in the summer of 1983 that the two holders of such licenses, Ingemar Stenmark of Sweden and Hanni Wenzel of Liechtenstein, would be ineligible to compete in the Olympics unless they surrendered those licenses and transferred the money received under them to the appropriate national ski or Olympic committees.

Although Wenzel was willing to transfer her money as requested, Stenmark, who had moved his tax residence to Monaco and had received an amount estimated at over $5 million in payments during those three years, was not, because repatriating the money to Sweden would subject him to millions of dollars in Swedish income tax.  Despite the different reactions of the two, FIS decided to treat Stenmark and Wenzel identically and ban them both from Olympic competition in 1984, while permitting both to continue to compete in World Cup competitions. After the Olympics, Hanni Wenzel, who had won two overall World Cup titles and finished second or third overall six more times, retired, and several of the other top skiers, such as the Mahre twins and Norway's Jarle Halsnes, turned professional and left the World Cup circuit.  The backlash over this series of events, combined with the increasing television revenues from the Olympic Games, led to the end of the ban on professional athletes in the Olympics before the end of the decade.

In another ruling regarding Olympic eligibility, FIS denied rising all-event skier Marc Girardelli, who was a citizen of Austria but who competed for Luxembourg on the World Cup circuit, the ability to compete in the Olympics for Austria, ruling that he could only compete for the country that he represented on the World Cup circuit. As a result, Girardelli was not able to compete in the Olympics until after his Luxembourg citizenship was granted in the mid-1980s.

Calendar

Men

Ladies

Men

Overall 

see complete table

In Men's Overall World Cup 1983/84 the best five downhills, best five giant slaloms/Super G, best five slaloms and best three combined count. The parallel slalom only counts for the Nationscup (or was a show-event). 29 racers had a point deduction.

Downhill 

see complete table

Giant Slalom / Super G 

see complete table

Ingemar Stenmark and Pirmin Zurbriggen finished tied on total points, but Stenmark's 4 race victories (compared to Zurbriggen's 3) gave him his seventh Giant Slalom (and Super G) World Cup! This record is still unbeaten!

Slalom 

see complete table

In Men's Slalom World Cup 1983/84 the best 5 results count. Marc Girardelli won the  cup with maximum points.

Combined 

see complete table

In Men's Combined World Cup 1983/84 all 5 results count.

Ladies

Overall 

see complete table

In Women's Overall World Cup 1983/84 the best four downhills, best four giant slaloms/Super G, best four slaloms and best three combined count. The parallel slalom only counts for the Nationscup (or was a show-event). 30 racers had a point deduction.

Downhill 

see complete table

In Women's Downhill World Cup 1983/84 the best 5 results count.

Giant Slalom / Super G 

see complete table

In Women's Giant Slalom and Super G World Cup 1983/84 the best 5 results count. Erika Hess won the cup with all points collected in Giant Slaloms.

Slalom 

see complete table

Combined 

see complete table

In Women's Combined World Cup 1983/84 the best 5 results count.

Nations Cup

Overall

Men 

All points were shown including individual deduction. But without parallel slalom, because result ? (Also possible, that the parallel slalom was only a show-event.)

Ladies 

All points were shown including individual deduction. But without parallel slalom, because result ? (Also possible, that the parallel slalom was only a show-event.)

References

External links
FIS-ski.com - World Cup standings - 1984

FIS Alpine Ski World Cup
World Cup
World Cup